Payrah Chal-e Monar (also Romanized as Pāyrāh Chāl-e Monār) is a village in Lalar and Katak Rural District, Chelo District, Andika County, Khuzestan Province, Iran. At the 2006 census, its population was 83, in 11 families.

References 

Populated places in Andika County